Anatoliy Kitsuta (born 22 December 1985) is a professional Ukrainian football defender who plays for FC Poltava on loan from PFC Sevastopol in the Ukrainian First League.

See also
 2005 FIFA World Youth Championship squads#Ukraine

External links
Profile at FFU website
Profile on Football Squads

1985 births
Living people
Footballers from Kyiv
Ukrainian footballers
Ukraine youth international footballers
Ukraine under-21 international footballers
FC Dynamo Kyiv players
FC Hoverla Uzhhorod players
FC Kharkiv players
FC Arsenal Kyiv players
FC Lviv players
FC Dnipro Cherkasy players
FC Obolon-Brovar Kyiv players
FC Kryvbas Kryvyi Rih players
FC Sevastopol players
FC Poltava players
Ukrainian Premier League players
Association football defenders